Manesar is a town and municipal corporation, know new  Gurugram City in the Gurugram district of the state of Haryana, India and a part of the National Capital Region (NCR) of Delhi. It is an industrial hub.

Its proximity to the burgeoning city of Gurugram has in recent years caused its character and demographics to change dramatically. It has many factories, offices, hotels, IT parks and educational institutes. There are several sightseeing spots around the area, some overlapping with Gurugram.

History
Earlier Manesar was a sleepy village of about 1000 dwellings on the Delhi-Jaipur highway, then numbered as NH-8. Since the late 1990s, it has been transformed into a booming town. Its growth has been helped by government's drive to move out factories from Delhi as well as the growth of Gurgaon city and proximity to Delhi's Indira Gandhi International Airport (approximately 40 minutes). Farmers have become millionaires or multi-millionaires by selling their lands.

Demographics
As of 2011 Indian Census, the Manesar census town had a total population of 23,448, of which 14,381 were males and 9,067 were females. Population within the age group of 0 to 6 years was 3,382. The total number of literates in Manesar was 18,105, which constituted 77.2% of the population with male literacy of 83.2% and female literacy of 67.8%. The effective literacy rate of 7+ population of Manesar was 90.2%, of which male literacy rate was 95.4% and female literacy rate was 81.6%. The Scheduled Castes population was 1,774. Manesar had 5074 households in 2011.

Industrial Model Township 
Manesar was planned in 1980's as Industrial Model Township(IMT) during formation of Maruti Udyog Ltd under Haryana State Industrial and Infrastructure Development Corporation which is under Haryana Government. Land acquisition proceedings for development of IMT Manesar were initiated in 1994-1995. Initial allotments of industrial plots to Maruti Vendors were made in 1997,and,other allotments commenced in 1999. Over the years,HSIIDC has allotted more than 2,100 plots for setting up of industrial ventures by entrepreneurs.
There are several large multinational companies, such as Maruti Suzuki, Jaquar, JBM Auto and Toshiba Eco City. Aadhar's national Data Center is also located here.

Attempts by the Government of Haryana to acquire additional land for expansion of the IMT development from 2011 led to numerous protests and legal challenges from farmers and other residents.

Manesar-Gurgaon land scam

On 17 September 2015, the Central Bureau of Investigation (CBI) registered a First Information Report under various sections of the Indian Penal Code relating to forgery, cheating and criminal conspiracy. These were in connection with alleged irregularities involving land acquisitions at IMT Manesar. Subsequently, in 2018, the former Haryana Chief Minister, Bhupinder Singh Hooda, together with real estate companies, officials of the state government's department of town and country planning and bureaucrats who worked with Hooda while he was Chief Minister were charged. Faced with the threat of government acquisition, farmers sold at knock-down prices, averaging 25 percent of market value, to real estate developers. The Hooda government then released the land from the acquisition threat, thus favouring the developers.

One of the beneficiary of the scam was Hooda's nephew, Sukhwinder, whose company was given change of land use (CLU) permission for 52 acres land on the same day the government acquisition process had lapsed for the want of release of funds, while at the same time CLU was denied to two other unrelated applicants.

The Supreme Court of India cancelled the acquisition and grant of land to the developers and directed the CBI to inquire further. The government was instructed to "recover every single pie". Court returned the land to Haryana government. Land would not be returned to the landholders more than the prevailing price. The builders will not be allowed to recover any money they paid to land owners as the deal was done to benefit them and "middlemen". The court said:

Administration

Proposal for new city
In 2018, the Chief Minister, Manohar Lal Khattar, announced a new city that would adjoin Gurgaon and incorporate an area from Manesar towards Rewari, and also the area around Pataudi. The new city is likely to be spread across at least 50,000 hectares, which is larger than Chandigarh (11,400 hectares) but smaller than Gurgaon (73,200 hectares).

Proposal of a new municipal corporation
In November 2020, Haryana Chief Minister Manohar Lal Khattar announced the creation of a new municipal corporation in Manesar. In December 2020, the Haryana Government approved the formation of the Manesar Municipal Corporation in a cabinet meeting.

Connectivity
Manesar lies on National Highway 48 and is served by many local buses and states Roadways buses and trains plying on this route. The nearest railway station is Ghari Harsaru; a major station is at Gurgaon.

Education
There are many government and private schools, the former being managed by the Government of Haryana through the Haryana Board of School Education (HBSE).

Tourism
The Heritage Transport Museum is situated on a  plot at Tauru Gurgaon, near Manesar. A built-up area of over  spread over four floors houses the exhibition galleries, library and reference centre, conference rooms, mini auditorium, the museum shop, and a restaurant facility.

Quarantine site 
In January 2020, the Indian Army set up a quarantine camp in Manesar for suspected cases of Coronavirus disease 2019. 300 Indian students airlifted from Wuhan district of China were quarantined and observed for 14 days, after which those with no symptoms were allowed to go home.

Economy

Some of the industrial units functioning in Manesar are:
Riello Power India Pvt Ltd
Alcatel-Lucent
Alere Inc.
Baxter
BorgWarner
Denso Haryana
Dudhsagar Dairy
Hero MotoCorp
Honda Motorcycle & Scooters India
Johnson Matthey
Keysight Technologies
Mankind Pharma
Maruti Suzuki
Samsung 
Pfizer

References

Villages in Gurgaon district
Economy of Gurgaon
Cities and towns in Gurgaon district
Tehsils in Haryana